was a Japanese photographer.

References

Japanese photographers
1909 births
1986 deaths